Sandy Boucher is an American writer, Buddhist, and feminist. She lives in Oakland, California.

Life and career 
Boucher received a master's degree from the Graduate Theological Union in Berkeley, California. Her degree was in the history and phenomenology of religion. For a time, she was a Buddhist nun in Sri Lanka.

Boucher has been a contributor to the publications Tricycle: The Buddhist Review and Lion's Roar, along with publishing articles in the San Francisco Chronicle, The Sun, and Writer's Digest.

In 1975 Boucher was a fellow at MacDowell Colony, an artists' colony in Peterborough, New Hampshire.

Published books 
 Assaults & Rituals: Stories (1975)
 The Notebooks of Leni Clare, and Other Short Stories (The Crossing Press feminist series) (1982)
 Heartwomen: An Urban Feminist's Odyssey Home (1982)
 Turning the Wheel: American Women Creating the New Buddhism (1993)
 Opening the Lotus: A Woman's Guide to Buddhism (1997)
 Discovering Kwan Yin: Buddhist Goddess of Compassion (1999)
 Hidden Spring: A Buddhist Woman Confronts Cancer (2000)
 Dancing in the Dharma: The Life and Teachings of Ruth Denison (2005)

References

External links 
 Official website

Living people
American feminist writers
American spiritual writers
American Buddhists
Writers from California
Buddhist feminists
Buddhist writers
20th-century American women writers
20th-century American non-fiction writers
American women non-fiction writers
Year of birth missing (living people)
21st-century American women